Johnny Yesno: The Original Soundtrack from the Motion Picture is an album by industrial band Cabaret Voltaire. It was made as a soundtrack to Peter Care's film of the same title, which in turn led to Peter Care directing the video for Cabaret Voltaire's hit song "Sensoria". This started a music video-making career for Peter Care, who has since then directed videos for R.E.M., Bruce Springsteen, Roy Orbison, and Depeche Mode, amongst others.

Track listing
Side A:
 "Taxi Music" – 14:34
 "Hallucination Sequence" – 4:49
Side B:
 "D.T.'s / Cold Turkey" – 4:10
 "The Quarry (In The Wilderness)" – 5:19
 "Title Sequence" – 3:35
 "Taxi Music Dub" – 8:33

Personnel
Cabaret Voltaire
Stephen Mallinder – vocals, bass
Richard H. Kirk – guitars, keyboards, tapes
Chris Watson – keyboards, tapes, drum computers

References

1983 soundtrack albums
Cabaret Voltaire (band) albums
1980s film soundtrack albums